Oh, Bloody Life is a 1984 Hungarian comedy film directed by Péter Bacsó.

Cast 
 Dorottya Udvaros - Sziráky Lucy
 Zoltán Bezerédi - Matura Sándor rendõrszázados
 András Kern - Guthy Róbert - rendezõ
  - Báró Samoday Kornél
  - Grófnő
 Ida Turay - Grófnő
 László Szacsvay - Kiptár József - tanító és párttitkár
 Lajos Őze - Zimányi - fõszerkesztõ

References

External links 

1984 comedy films
1984 films
Hungarian comedy films
1980s Hungarian-language films